Botaniska trädgården is a botanical garden in central Lund, Sweden, open to the public daily without charge. The 8 hectares site contains 7000 species of plants, of which 200 are found in the greenhouses representing nine different climate zones. It is owned and operated by Lund University. Its international identification code is LD.

History
The university garden has existed since 1690, at that time in front of the present site of the Lund University Main Building. In the 1860s the garden outgrew the area and was, in 1862 to, moved  its current location along Östra Vallgatan. This time Jacob Georg Agardh designed the blueprints for the garden and greenhouses. In 1974 the garden was named a national historical landmark.

References

External links

  

Botanical gardens in Sweden
Lund
1690 establishments in Sweden
Tourist attractions in Lund
Lund University